Acanthocercodes is a genus of monopisthocotylean monogeneans, belonging to the family Diplectanidae. All its species are parasites of the gill lamellae of marine teleosts.
The type-species of the genus is Acanthocercodes bullardi Kritsky & Diggles, 2015.

Species
According to the World Register of Marine Species, species include:

 Acanthocercodes bullardi Kritsky & Diggles, 2015
 Acanthocercodes megacirrus (Maillard & Vala, 1980) Kritsky & Diggles, 2015
 Acanthocercodes polynemus (Tripathi, 1957) Kritsky & Diggles, 2015
 Acanthocercodes spinosus (Maillard & Vala, 1980) Kritsky & Diggles, 2015

References

Diplectanidae
Monogenea genera